Harvard Design Magazine (ISSN 1093-4421) is a biannual publication of the Harvard Graduate School of Design. It is indexed by the standard subject bibliographies, including Avery Index to Architectural Periodicals, Bibliography of the History of Art, and Artbibliographies Modern. Harvard Design Magazine is a registered nonprofit organization.

History 
Harvard Design Magazine was founded in 1997 by former editors William S. Saunders and Nancy Levinson, who co-edited the magazine until 2001. From 2013 - 2019, Jennifer Sigler was Editor in Chief and with Deputy Editor Leah Whitman-Salkin released issues 38 - 47. In 2019, Julie Cirelli became Editorial Director and works in close collaboration with Meghan Ryan Sandberg, Production Manager.

Harvard Design Magazine was relaunched in spring 2021 with issue 48. This issue debuts a redesign by the Copenhagen-based graphic design studio Alexis Mark and introduces a new editorial model in which scholars and practitioners from across the design disciplines are invited to guest edit each issue.

Current and Past Issues

Harvard Design Magazine has been published since 1997. Its issues, as listed below, are available for sale.

Number 49: "Publics" (F/W 2021)

Number 48: "America" (S/S 2021), guest edited by Mark Lee and Florencia Rodriguez

Number 47: "Inside Scoop" (S/S 2019)

Number 46: "No Sweat" (F/W 2018)

Number 45: "Into the Woods" (S/S 2018)

Number 44: "Seventeen" (F/W 2017)

Number 43: "Shelf Life" (F/W 2016)

Number 42: "Run for Cover!" (S/S 2016)

Number 41: "Family Planning" (F/W 2015)

Number 40: "Well, Well, Well" (S/S 2015),

Number 39: "Wet Matter" (F/W 2014)

Number 38: "Do You Read Me?" (S/S 2014)

Number 37: "Urbanism Core?" (Winter 2014)

Number 36: "Landscape Architecture's Core?" (S/S 2013)

Number 35: "Architecture's Core?" (F/W 2012)

Number 34: "Architectures of Latin America" (F/W 2011)

Number 33: "Design Practices Now, Vol. II" (F/W 2010)

Number 32: "Design Practices Now, Vol. I" (S/S 2010)

Number 31: "(Sustainability) + Pleasure, Vol. II: Landscapes, Urbanism, and Products" (F/W 2009)

Number 30: "(Sustainability) + Pleasure, Vol. I: Culture and Architecture" (S/S 2009)

Number 29: "What About Inside?" (F/W 2008)

Number 28: "Can Designers Improve Life in Non-Formal Cities?" (S/S 2008)

Number 27: "Open Mike" (F/W 2007)

Number 26: "New Skyscrapers in Megacities on a Warming Globe" (S/S 2007)

Number 25: "Urban Design Now" (F/W 2006)

Number 24: "The Origins and Evolution of 'Urban Design', 1956-2006" (S/S 2006)

Number 23: "Regeneration: Design as Dialogue, Building as Transformation" (F/W 2005)

Number 22: "Urban Planning Now: What Works, What Doesn't?" (S/S 2005)

Number 21: "Rising Ambitions, Expanding Terrain: Realism and Utopianism" (F/W 2004)

Number 20: "Stocktaking 2004: Nine Questions about the Present and Future of Design" (S/S 2004)

Number 19: "Architecture as Conceptual Art? Blurring Disciplinary Boundaries" (F/W 2003)

Number 18: "Building Nature's Ruin?: Realities, Illusions, and Efficacy of Nature-Sustaining Design" (S/S 2003)

Number 17: "Design, Inc.: Commodification, Collaboration, and Resistance" (F/W 2002)

Number 16: "HARD/soft, Cool/WARM... Gender in Design, plus Classic Books part II" (S/S 2002)

Number 15: "Five Houses, plus American Scenes" (F/W 2001)

Number 14: "What Makes a Work Canonical?" (S/S 2001)

Number 13: "East of Berlin: Postcommunist Cities Now" (S/S 2001)

Number 12: "Sprawl and Spectacle" (Fall 2000)

Number 11: "Design and Class" (Summer 2000)

Number 10: "What is Nature Now?" (Spring 2000)

Number 09: "Constructions of Memory: On Monuments Old and New" (Fall 1999)

Number 08: "Housing and Community" (Summer 1999)

Number 07: "Conflicting Values" (Spring 1999)

Number 06: "Representations/Misrepresentations and Revaluations of Classic Books" (Fall 1998)

Number 05: "Design, Arts, and Architecture" (Summer 1998)

Number 04: "Popular Places, plus Books on Cities and Urbanism" (Spring 1998)

Number 03: "Durability and Ephemerality, plus Books on History and Theory" (Fall 1997)

Number 02: "Look Again: Recognizing Neglected Design" (Summer 1997)

Number 01: "Changing Cities plus the New Urbanism, Gender and Design" (Spring 1997)

Reviews and Mentions
Designers and Books, Interview with Jennifer Sigler about the relaunch of the Harvard Design Magazine with issue number 38, "Do You Read Me?", September 2014.

It's Nice That, Interview with Jennifer Sigler about the relaunch of the Harvard Design Magazine, January 2015.

D&AD Award, Harvard Design Magazine, number 38, "Do You Read Me?" January, 2015.

magCulture, Harvard Design Magazine, number 42, "Shelf Life," featured as magazine of the week, September 2017.

Stack Magazines, Video Review of Harvard Design Magazine, number 44, "Seventeen," September 2017.

Stack Magazines, "Love your Work?" Interview with Jennifer Sigler and Leah Whitman-Salkin about Harvard Design Magazine, number 46, "No Sweat," February 2019.

References

External links
 Link to homepage of Harvard Design Magazine

Visual arts magazines published in the United States
Architecture magazines
Biannual magazines published in the United States
Design magazines
Harvard University publications
Magazines established in 1997
Magazines published in Boston